Wendell Edward Pierce (born December 8, 1963) is an American actor and businessman. Having trained at Juilliard School, Pierce rose to prominence as a character actor portraying roles both on the stage and screen. He first gained recognition portraying the role of Detective Bunk Moreland in the acclaimed HBO drama series The Wire from 2002 to 2008. 

His other notable television roles includes the trombonist Antoine Batiste in Treme (2010–2013), James Greer in Tom Clancy's Jack Ryan (2018–present), the attorney Robert Zane in Suits (2013–2019), and Clarence Thomas in Confirmation (2016). He earned Independent Spirit Awards nominations for his film roles in Four (2012) and Burning Cane (2019), which he also served as a producer. Other notable film roles include Malcolm X (1992), Waiting to Exhale (1995), Ray (2004), Selma (2014), The Gift (2015) and Clemency (2019).

Pierce made his Broadway debut in John Pielmeier's 1985 play The Boys of Winter, followed by Caryl Churchill's Serious Money in 1988. As a theatrical producer, he earned a Tony Award for Best Play nomination for August Wilson's Radio Golf (2007), then winning for Bruce Norris's Clybourne Park (2012). He performed the lead role of Willy Loman in the 2019 revival of a play Death of a Salesman on the West End in London earning a Laurence Olivier Award for Best Actor in a Leading Role in a Play nomination. He reprised the role on Broadway in the 2022–2023 season.

Early life
Pierce was born in New Orleans, one of three sons of a teacher and a decorated World War II veteran who worked as a maintenance engineer. His father's segregated Army unit helped Marines win the Battle of Saipan in 1944. Pierce has said of his father's experience: "My father fought in World War II, loved this country when this country wasn't loving him back. My father fought in Saipan, came back, was awarded medals and were denied them by a white officer who said, no, not you, not your unit. There was nothing that this country was doing for him or to him that would make him love this country. And in spite of all of that, he gave us a love for country because of the values that we are aspiring to as a nation."Pierce was raised in the black middle-class community of Pontchartrain Park, the first African-American post-war suburb. His father, along with many other black veterans, moved into the neighborhood after returning home from the war.

Pierce graduated in 1981 from both Benjamin Franklin High School and the New Orleans Center for Creative Arts (most NOCCA students attend traditional secondary school in the mornings and the arts school in the afternoons). In 1981, Pierce was named a Presidential Scholar of the Arts. As a young actor, he appeared in The Winter's Tale at the Tulane Shakespeare Festival. He produced and hosted Think About It, a youth-themed talk show, for the local NBC affiliate station, and also hosted a weekly jazz show on WYLD-FM Radio called Extensions from Congo Square.

Pierce then attended the Juilliard School's Drama Division from 1981 to 1985 graduating as a member of Group 14 with a Bachelor of Fine Arts.

Career
Pierce has been in over 30 films, appeared in nearly 50 television shows, and has performed in dozens of stage productions. He worked on the HBO dramas The Wire and Treme. When first cast in The Wire, Pierce and his castmates doubted the show would be a hit: "I remember the first time we all sat around and watched the pilot. We all turned to each other and said, 'Man, I don't think this shit is going anywhere.'" In 2012, he played J. Jenks in The Twilight Saga: Breaking Dawn – Part 2.

For his role in Treme, Pierce learned to play the trombone, though he relied on "sound double" Stafford Agee of the Rebirth Brass Band. Agee played off-camera for Pierce, syncing his trombone with Pierce's motions for authenticity.

Pierce was nominated for an Independent Spirit Award for Best Male Lead for his portrayal of Joe, a married and closeted gay man who steps out on his family with a young white man he met online, in Four. The film was released on September 13, 2013, around the same time that The Michael J. Fox Show debuted on NBC, in which Pierce played Michael J. Fox's character's boss until the show's cancellation some five months later.

From 2015 to 2017, Pierce starred, alongside Matthew Perry and Thomas Lennon, in a revival of the sitcom The Odd Couple on CBS playing the role of Teddy.

When Mike Henry stepped down as the voice of Cleveland Brown on Family Guy in June 2020, in light of the George Floyd protests, Pierce launched a campaign to become Henry's replacement. He lost the role to YouTube personality Arif Zahir.

Stage
Pierce has been in numerous stage productions. He was lauded for his performance as Holt Fay in Queenie at the John F. Kennedy Center. He has performed on Broadway in staged productions of The Piano Lesson, Serious Money, and The Boys of Winter. He has performed off-Broadway in The Cherry Orchard (for which he was nominated for a VIV Award for Lead Actor), Waiting for Godot (which was set on a New Orleans rooftop post-Hurricane Katrina), and Broke-ology performed at Lincoln Center for the Performing Arts. Other performances include Cymbeline (at The Public Theater), The Good Times Are Killing Me, Two Gentlemen of Verona, Tis Pity She's a Whore, and Ms. Ever's Boys performed at the ACT Theatre.

Pierce is also a theater producer and produced the Broadway show, Clybourne Park. The show was nominated for four Tony Awards; and won the Tony Award for Best Play in 2012. In 2015, Pierce returned to the stage to star in the Billie Holiday Theatre production of Jackie Alexander's Brothers from the Bottom in New York.

In 2019, Pierce starred in the acclaimed Arthur Miller play Death of a Salesman at the Young Vic Theatre in London and its successful transfer to the West End. For this performance, he received a nomination for the Olivier Award for Best Actor. The show made its Broadway transfer in 2022 returning with Pierce and Sharon D. Clarke, and Andre De Shields. In December 2022, on one of the nights of its production run, a woman disrupted the beginning of Act 2, shouting at the stage. Pierce tried to calm her down from the stage, and reportedly was patient in his attempts to calm her down. She was eventually escorted out of the building by authorities and the play's producers issued a statement writing, "We're grateful to the entire team at the Hudson Theatre for working together to resolve the situation and resume the performance as quickly as possible." Videos of the event and Pierce's attempts to reason with the patron went viral online.

Radio
In 2009, Pierce became the host of the nationally syndicated, Peabody Award-winning radio program, Jazz at Lincoln Center, which featured live recordings from Jazz at Lincoln Center's House of Swing. That show was replaced by Jazz Night in America from NPR, hosted by jazz bassist Christian McBride.

Music
In 2016, Pierce started appearing on several albums recorded in New Orleans. He recorded the song "Make America Great Again" with Delfeayo Marsalis in 2016, one song with Kermit Ruffins on Irvin Mayfield's 2017 album, A Beautiful World, and one with Stanton Moore on his 2017 album, With You In Mind. In 2020, Pierce recorded "The Ever Fonky Lowdown" with Wynton Marsalis.

Business and philanthropy
Pierce considers himself a "true capitalist" and a "classic entrepreneur".

In 2013, Fast Company named Pierce one of the "100 Most Creative People in Business".

Non-profit work
Pierce started the non-profit, Pontchartrain Park Community Development Corp. to build new affordable solar and geothermal homes in the area for families displaced by Hurricane Katrina.

Sterling Farms
Inspired in part by Michelle Obama's initiative to bring more supermarkets to food deserts where residents lack easy access to fresh produce, Pierce, along with partners Troy Henry and James Hatchett, started a chain of grocery stores named Sterling Farms in the Ninth Ward of New Orleans in 2012. The chain however closed thirteen months later. Sterling Farms also had a convenience store division called Sterling Express. The stores were named after Sterling Henry, his business partner's father who ran a pharmacy for about 40 years in the Lower Ninth Ward.

Personal life
Pierce describes himself as "tri-coastal", splitting his time among Los Angeles, New York City, and New Orleans. He is a supporter of the New Orleans Saints, and locals have nicknamed him "Saints Wendell". He is also an avid supporter of St. Patrick's Athletic FC.

He is Catholic.

Pierce was a vocal supporter of Hillary Clinton and was on the board of Alliance for a Healthier Generation, a campaign created by the Clinton Foundation. Pierce attended the 2012 Democratic National Convention, was one of President Barack Obama's top campaign fundraisers in 2012, and once escorted Gwen Ifill to a White House State Dinner.

2016 arrest
On Sunday, May 15, 2016, Pierce was arrested and charged with simple battery for an alleged attack against a female Bernie Sanders supporter outside Atlanta Loews Hotel. He was booked and released on $1,000 bond from Fulton County Jail. Pierce subsequently completed a pre-trial diversion program, including counselling and community service resulting in dismissal of the charge.

Filmography

Film

Television

Theatre

Awards and nominations

References

External links
 
 
 
 Wendell Pierce Opens Up About 'Treme', Jazz and New Orleans (interview with Wendell Pierce). Retrieved May 3, 2014.

1963 births
Living people
20th-century African-American people
20th-century American male actors
21st-century African-American people
21st-century American male actors
African-American Catholics
African-American male actors
American male film actors
American male television actors
Businesspeople from New Orleans
Juilliard School alumni
Male actors from New Orleans